St. Mary's Central High School (SMCHS) is a private, Roman Catholic, co-educational high school in Bismarck, North Dakota, United States. It is part of the Light of Christ Catholic Schools district and is located in the Roman Catholic Diocese of Bismarck.

Originally at 1025 North 2nd Street, it moved to a new campus in the far north of the metro area in 2019. The previous campus is now St. Mary's Academy, a dedicated middle school (grades 6-8).

References

External links 

 

Schools in Burleigh County, North Dakota
Catholic secondary schools in North Dakota
Buildings and structures in Bismarck, North Dakota
Roman Catholic Diocese of Bismarck
North Dakota High School Activities Association (Class A)
North Dakota High School Activities Association (Class AAA Football)